The 2009 European Parliament election in Latvia involved the election of the delegation from Latvia to the European Parliament in 2009. 17 lists containing a total of 185 candidates were registered for the election.

The election was conducted according to the party-list proportional representation system, with at least 5% of votes necessary to gain seats in the parliament. Voters were given 17 ballot papers, one for each party and had the opportunity to approve of candidates on their chosen list by adding a plus or disapprove by crossing out candidates.

Results

Elected MEPs

References

External links
Latvijas Republikas Uzņēmumu Reģistrs: Politisko partiju reģistrs: gives list of registered parties & associations and explains the difference.
Corruption Prevention and Combating Bureau (KNAB), political parties financing data base->donations 
Latvia EP elections results
Latvia EP elections: candidates
Latvia EP elections: List programs and statistics
Exit polls

Latvia
European Parliament elections in Latvia
2009 in Latvia